Sarah (Sally) Lois Price (born 1956)  is Professor of Physical Chemistry at University College London.

Education
Price was educated at the University of Cambridge, where she was awarded a Bachelor of Arts degree in 1977 followed by a PhD in 1980. Her doctoral research modelled the intermolecular forces between diatomic molecules and was supervised by Anthony Stone.

Awards and memberships
Price was elected a Fellow of the Royal Society (FRS) in 2017 and was awarded the Interdisciplinary Prize by the Royal Society of Chemistry in 2015. Price is a member of the American Chemical Society and the British Crystallographic Association. In 2018 Price was elected as a Member of the Academica Europea.

References

Fellows of the Royal Society
Female Fellows of the Royal Society
Alumni of the University of Cambridge
Living people
1956 births